Willoughby–Suydam Historic District is a national historic district in Brooklyn, New York, New York.  It consists of 50 contributing residential buildings built between 1902 and 1904.  They are three story brick tenements that have two apartments per floor.  Some feature yellow and white terra cotta detailing.

It was listed on the National Register of Historic Places in 1983.

References

External links
Flatbush–Tompkins Congregational Church website

Historic districts on the National Register of Historic Places in Brooklyn